Smithsonian Channel's Sound Revolution is a documentary television series hosted by award-winning actor Morgan Freeman. Documentary footage, expert interviews and musical performances trace the origins of be-bop, jazz, rock 'n' roll and soul music, all emanating from “ground zero” – Clarksdale, Mississippi – and the Mississippi Delta.   Each hour-long program is filled with recent performances, largely from the Montreux Jazz Festival, featuring performances by: B.B. King, Ike Tuner, Buddy Guy, Etta James, Eric Clapton, Carlos Santana, Robert Cray, Miles Davis, The Neville Brothers and many others.  The show premiered November 2008 on Smithsonian Networks. It was scripted by British writer Joe Cushley, directed by Chris Walker and produced by Alan Ravenscroft.

Episodes

Season 1 (2008)
 Blues Beginnings
 Traveling Blues
 Sounds of Jazz
 Free Jazz to Future Jazz
 Soul Stirrings
 Heart of Soul

Featured individuals
Ray Charles, featured in the episode "Soul Stirrings".

External links
Official Website
Videos
Smithsonian Networks
Smithsonian Channel Blog

Smithsonian Channel original programming
2008 American television series debuts
2008 American television series endings
2000s American documentary television series